Fahrenheit (ฟาเรนไฮต์) is a Thai rock band featuring a female lead vocalist, Piraporn Pranpanas, backed by former members of other well-known Thai rock bands. Guitarist Pichet Kruawan is from Y Not 7 while drummer Kittisak and founding bassist Apirath Sukkhajitr are from Loso. Bassist Apirath left the band to rejoin Loso, and Arkom Nuchanin (from Taxi) joined Fahrenheit in March 2006. Despite no new album during that period, the band's new lineup could be seen in live concerts. Pichet Kruawan left the band after Fahrenheit Way album and is replaced by Chamnan Khamenchan from SYAM band. The band also plays backup for Asanee-Wasan.

The band's songs include "Yah hak lang" ("อย่าหักหลัง", translation "Don't betray me"), "Naam dtaa keu kam dtop" ("น้ำตาคือคำตอบ", "My tears are my answer"), "Ngiap tam-mai" ("เงียบทำไม", "Why so quiet?") and "Pid mai" ("ผิดไหม", "Is it wrong?").

Members
 Piraporn Pranpanas (Sai): Vocals.	
 Chamnan Khamenchan (Nan): Guitar	
 Kittisak Khotkam (Yai) : Drums (b. January 22, 1973)	
 Arkom Nuchanin (Ake) : Bass (b. June 14, 1974)

Discography
 Degree Fahrenheit (องศาฟาเรนไฮต์) (January 2005)
 Extra Fahrenheit (December 2005) (special album with rearranged songs and two new songs)
 Fahrenheit Way (September 2006)

External links
More Music

Thai rock music groups
Musical groups from Bangkok